Azinomycin B is a natural product that contains densely assembled functionalities with potent antitumor activity. It is isolated from Streptomyces sahachiroi  which is reisolated from S. griseofuscus along with its analog azinomycin A. Azinomycin B can bind within the major groove of DNA and forms covalent interstrand crosslinks (ISCs) with the purine bases. The DNA alkylation and crosslinking by azinomycin B suggests its potent antitumor activity.

Biosynthesis 

The biosynthesis of azinomycin B includes a type 1 polyketide synthase and several nonribosomal peptide synthetases.

References

Polyketides
Aziridines
Epoxides